The MLS Central Division was one of Major League Soccer's three divisions, existing in 2000 and 2001.

Division lineups

2000–2001

Lineup for 2000–2001
Chicago Fire
Columbus Crew
Dallas Burn
Tampa Bay Mutiny

Changes from 1999
The new Central Division is created
The Chicago Fire and Dallas Burn move in from the Western Conference (which became the Western Division)
The Columbus Crew and Tampa Bay Mutiny move in from the Eastern Conference (which became the Eastern Division)

After the 2001 season
The Miami Fusion and Tampa Bay Mutiny were contracted, resulting in the disbanding of the Central Division
The Chicago Fire and Columbus Crew move to the Eastern Division (now renamed Eastern Conference)
The Dallas Burn move to the Western Division (now renamed Western Conference)

Central Division champions by year
2000: Chicago Fire
2001: Chicago Fire†

† – The Chicago Fire were declared winners of the Central Division in 2001 after the September 11 attacks caused the cancellation of the rest of the regular season. The MLS Cup Playoffs began on September 20.

See also

Eastern Conference (MLS)
Western Conference (MLS)

References
Complete MLS History

Major League Soccer

zh:美國聯盟東區